Yameshwar or Jameshwar Temple is a very old temple dedicated to Shiva being worshiped by Yama. It is situated in Bhubaneswar, Odisha, India, near Bharati Matha, in Jameshwar Patna.

Architecture
The main Vimana is in Rekha Deula style, Jaga mohan is in Pidha Deula style and there is a detached mandapa. Many portions of the temple have been damaged by natural calamities as the temple is built by sandstone. The outer Prakara is built by laterite. The icons around the temple include many motifs like Dikpalas, Amarous couple, Nayikas, Vidalas, Erotics, elephant procession etc.... The inner Garbhagriha houses Shivalinga within a circular yonipitha. The temple was built in the 13th-14th century during the Eastern Ganga dynasty.

Festivals
The Jiuntia or Puajiutia festival which is also called Dwitvahana osha falling in Ashwin is very popular in this temple, others being Shivaratri and Kartik Purnima. All Mondays and Sankramana days are important in this temple. People who visit this temple during Bharani nakshatra are said to be free from all miseries.

See also
 List of temples in Bhubaneswar

Gallery

References

External links

 Images of the temple on Indira Gandhi National Centre for the arts
 temple report on Indira Gandhi National Centre for the arts

Hindu temples in Bhubaneswar
Shiva temples in Odisha
12th-century Hindu temples
Sandstone buildings in India